Gyönk is a village in Tolna County, Hungary.

History
Gyönk was mentioned for the first time in 1280, but the neighborhood (and Gyönk) was already a populated area by then. The village was inhabited by Turks for some time, and by the time of the Rákóczi it was depopulated. In the early 18th century Hungarian and German families arrived in the village. The school was founded in 1806. In 1882, the Budapest-Pécs-Dombóvár-rail line, which passes through the Kapos Valley connected the village.

In 1891, there were 3,371 German and Hungarian inhabitants. In 1947, a Czechoslovak-Hungarian population exchange saw 9 Highland Hungarian families (55 people) resettled in the upland village of Martos.

Until the end of World War II, the majority of the inhabitants were Danube Swabians (Schwowe), their ancestors came from Swabia and Franconia. Around 1790, Catholic German families from Gyönk settled in Illocska. Mostly of the former German Settlers was expelled to Allied-occupied Germany and Allied-occupied Austria in 1945–1948, about the Potsdam Agreement.
Only a few Germans of Hungary live there, the majority today are the descendants of Hungarians from the Czechoslovak–Hungarian population exchange.

Notable landmarks
The Reformed Church was built between 1775 and 1777, and consecrated on May 25, 1777. The tower was completed in 1836. The second organ of the church, dated to 1910 is a masterpiece. The neo-Gothic style Lutheran Church designed by Gyula Reppmannin was completed in 1896. The Catholic Church was built in 1926. Magyary Kossa-Castle was built in 1830.

Twin towns – sister cities

Gyönk is twinned with:
 Darmstadt, Germany, since 1990
 Griesheim, Germany, since 1990
 Bar-le-Duc, France, since 1996
 Wilkau-Haßlau, Germany, since  1997

References

Populated places in Tolna County